Macris Fernanda Silva Carneiro (born March 3, 1989), is a volleyball player from Brazil. She acts as setter, playing in [Fenerbahçe S.K.]and in the [[Brazil women'national team web|url=https://en.volleyballworld.com/en/vnl/2019/women/teams/bra-brazil/players/macris_fernanda_silva_carneiro?id=71716|title=Player profile|access-date=2019-05-21|website=volleyballworld.com}}</ref>

Awards

Individuals 

 2013–14 Brazilian Superliga – "Best Setter"
 2014–15 Brazilian Superliga – "Best Setter"
 2015–16 Brazilian Superliga – "Best Setter"
 2016–17 Brazilian Superliga – "Best Setter"
 2018 South American Club Championship - "Best Setter"
 2018–19 Brazilian Superliga – "Most Valuable Player"
 2018–19 Brazilian Superliga – "Best Setter"
 2018 Club World Championship - "Best Setter"
 2019 South American Club Championship - "Best Setter"
 2019 FIVB Nations League - "Best Setter"
 2019–20 Brazilian Superliga – "Best Setter"
 2020 South American Club Championship - "Best Setter"
 2020–21 Brazilian Superliga – "Best Setter"
 2021–22 Brazilian Superliga – "Best Setter"
 2021–22 Brazilian Superliga – "Most Valuable Player"
 2022 South American Club Championship - "Best Setter"

Clubs 

 2017–18 Brazilian Superliga –  Bronze medal, with Camponesa/Minas
 2018–19 Brazilian Superliga –  Champion, with Itambé/Minas
 2020–21 Brazilian Superliga –  Champion, with Itambé/Minas
 2021–22 Brazilian Superliga –  Champion, with Itambé/Minas
 2018 South American Club Championship –  Champion, with Camponesa/Minas
 2019 South American Club Championship –  Champion, with Itambé/Minas
 2020 South American Club Championship –  Champion, with Itambé/Minas
 2018 FIVB Club World Championship –  Runner-up, with Itambé/Minas
 2022 South American Club Championship –  Champion, with Itambé/Minas
 2021–22 Turkish Super Cup -  Champion, with Fenerbahçe Beko

References

1989 births
Living people
Brazilian women's volleyball players
Volleyball players at the 2015 Pan American Games
Pan American Games silver medalists for Brazil
Pan American Games medalists in volleyball
Medalists at the 2015 Pan American Games
Setters (volleyball)
Volleyball players at the 2020 Summer Olympics
Olympic volleyball players of Brazil
Medalists at the 2020 Summer Olympics
Olympic medalists in volleyball
Olympic silver medalists for Brazil
Sportspeople from São Paulo (state)